Tanyard Creek is a stream in the U.S. state of Georgia. It is a tributary to Echeconnee Creek.

It is unknown why the name "Tanyard Creek" was applied to this stream.

References

Rivers of Georgia (U.S. state)
Rivers of Crawford County, Georgia
Rivers of Monroe County, Georgia